Iqbaal Dhiafakhri Ramadhan (born 28 December 1998) is an Indonesian actor and singer. He is best known as an ex-member of the Indonesian boy band CJR, and for his leading role in Dilan 1990 (2018). In 2018, he won the Variety Asian Star: Up Next award at the International Film Festival & Awards Macao for his role in that drama.

Early life
Iqbaal was born on 28 December 1998 and is the son of Herry Hernawan and his wife Rike Dhamayanti. Fildza Hasnamudia is his elder sister.

Career

He made his public debut as Trapani in the musical drama Laskar Pelangi (2010–2011). There he met with Coboy Junior producer Patrick Effendy. He also played a role in the movie 5 Elang as Rusdi Badruddin in 2011, and had a single titled "Thank You". Iqbaal later became a founding member of boy band Coboy Junior, which was officially formed on July 23, 2011. In his career with Kiki, Aldi, and Bastian in Coboy Junior, he starred in the drama series Only You. In June 2013, Iqbaal and Coboy Junior released their debut film, entitled Coboy Junior The Movie.

On February 23, 2014, after the resignation of Coboy Junior member Bastian, Management decided to change the name of the band, which then only consisted of three people, to CJR.

In addition to activities in CJR, he also made a single devoted to his fans, SoniQ. He is also known as a teenager who performs many positive programs, such as singing for fans, #SoniQSaving, #SoniQGoBetter, and the latest one is #SoniQSoldiers.

In 2015, he formed a quartet pop punk band called The Second Breaktime with his high school mates. The band cited All Time Low and 5 Seconds of Summer as influences. Iqbaal also made a new group called Svmmerdose with tararin. Iqbaal serves as both vocalist and guitarist. 

In 2018, he played Dilan in the teenage drama film Dilan 1990, adapted from Pidi Baiq's best-selling novel Dilanku 1990. On May 25, 2018, it was announced that he would play Minke, a native who is able to enroll in an exclusive school for the Dutch, in Bumi Manusia, a film based on the Pramoedya Ananta Toer's novel of the same name.

Education

Iqbaal graduated from Armand Hammer United World College of the American West, New Mexico, after attending on a United World Colleges (UWC) scholarship as the only representative from Indonesia in his year. He is now studying as a communication science major at Monash University, Melbourne, Australia.

Brand ambassador

As of 2018, Iqbaal was appointed as brand ambassador of digital education platform Ruangguru

Filmography

Film

Television

Discography

Albums

With Coboy Junior
 CJR (2013)

With CJR
 Lebih Baik (2015)

Solo albums
 Songs For SoniQ I EP (2013)
 Songs For SoniQ II EP (2014)
 Songs For SoniQ III EP (2015)

With The Second Breaktime
 The Second Breaktime EP (2016)

With Svmmerdose 

 She/her/hers (2019)
 Yeah Yeah Youth (2021)

Singles 

 "Terima Kasih" (2011)
 "Jenderal Kancil" (with Coboy Junior) (2012)
 "Ngaca Dulu Deh" (with Coboy Junior) (2013)
 "Life is Bubble Gum" (with CJR) (2014)
 "Juara Dunia" (with CJR) (2014)
 "Goyang Joget" (with CJR)  (2014)
 "Warnai Pelangi"  (2015)
 "Jika Bisa Memilih" (with CJR)(2016)
 "Independent" (with Svmmerdose) (2017)
 "Rindu Sendiri" (2018)
 "Got It All" (with Svmmerdose) (2018)
 "Hello You" (2018)
 "Crush" (with Svmmerdose) (2019)
 "Break My Walls" (with Svmmerdose) (2019)

Tours 

 CJR Generation (2013)

Music videos 

 "Bermain Dengan Hatiku – The Rain" (2010)
 "2nd Anniversary SoniQ" (2013)
 "Songs From SoniQ 2013" (2013)
 "3rd Anniversary SoniQ" (2014)
 "Songs From SoniQ 2014" (2014)
 "4th Anniversary SoniQ" (2015)
 "5th Anniversary SoniQ" (2016)
 "Warnai Pelangi" (2016)
 "Yang Terdalam – Noah (2022)"

Musical dramas 

 Laskar Pelangi (2010–2011)

Incident 

On the morning of 22 June 2015 Ramadhan was involved in a motorcycle accident in Bekasi, West Java, after attending morning prayers.

Awards and nominations

References

External links 
 
 
 
 

1998 births
Indonesian male actors
Indonesian bass guitarists
Indonesian child singers
Indonesian guitarists
21st-century Indonesian male singers
Indonesian Muslims
Living people
Male child actors
21st-century guitarists
People educated at a United World College